This is a list of presidents of Djibouti. Since the establishment of the office of president in 1977, there have been two presidents. The president is both head of state and head of government of Djibouti and the commander-in-chief of the Djibouti Armed Forces. The current president is Ismaïl Omar Guelleh, since 1999.

Overview
The first president of Djibouti was Hassan Gouled Aptidon, one of the leaders of the Ligue Populaire Africaine pour l'Indépendance (LPAI), who took office on 27 June 1977, the day on which Djibouti was declared a republic.

List of officeholders

Timeline

Latest election

See also
Djibouti
List of prime ministers of Djibouti
First Lady of Djibouti
French Territory of the Afars and the Issas (FTAI)
French Somaliland
List of governors of French Somaliland
Lists of office-holders

Notes

References

External links
World Statesmen – Djibouti

Djibouti

Djibouti politics-related lists
1977 establishments in Djibouti